Lamella (plural lamellae) means a small plate or flake in Latin, and in English may refer to:

Biology
 Lamella (mycology), a papery rib beneath a mushroom cap
 Lamella (botany)
 Lamella (surface anatomy), a plate-like structure in an animal
 Lamella of osteon, the concentric circles around the central Haversian canals
 Lamella (cell biology):
 (i) part of a chloroplast (thin extension of thylakoid joining different grana)
 (ii) the leading edge of motile cells, containing the lamellipodia
 Lamella (crab), a group of land crabs in the family Gecarcinucidae
 Uroleptus lamella, a species of protozoans
 Middle lamella, a pectin layer which cements the cell walls of two adjoining plant cells together

Other uses
 Lamella (materials), a fine, plate-like structure, usually in a group
 Lamella clarifier, an inclined-plate clarifier used in water treatment systems
 Lamella (structures), used to cover wide, open areas with no supporting members (i.e. arenas, "domes")
 Musical instrument reed